Tennessee Creek is a stream in the U.S. state of Mississippi.

The name "Tennessee Creek" is derived from the Cherokee village Tanasi.

References

Rivers of Mississippi
Rivers of George County, Mississippi
Mississippi placenames of Native American origin